Since the beginning of 2022, multiple unusual deaths of Russian businesspeople or high officials, sometimes including their family members, have occurred under what some sources suggest were suspicious circumstances, further evidencing the dire conditions facing Russian nationals imposed by the Russian state.

Analysis 
On 3 June 2022 the Dutch NOS news network described the phenomenon as "a grim series of Russian billionaires, many from the oil and gas industries, who have been found dead under unusual circumstances since early this year. The first was on 30 January, when 60-year-old Leonid Shulman, transport chief for Russian energy giant Gazprom, was found dead in the bathroom of his country house in the Leningrad region. Beside his body was a suicide note." On 6 July 2022, CNN Portugal described the group as "millionaires with direct or indirect links to the Kremlin found dead in a mystery scenario since the beginning of the year". It referred to a previous investigation by USA Today, which concluded that "38 Russian businessmen and oligarchs close to the Kremlin died in mysterious or suspicious circumstances between 2014 and 2017." In December 2022, The Atlantic labeled the phenomenon "Sudden Russian Death Syndrome".

Friends and families of the deceased Russian businessmen generally found it "unthinkable" that they killed themselves – and in some cases also their wives and children – and have demanded an independent investigation into the mysterious deaths. Igor Volobuyev, the Ukrainian-born ex-vice-chairman of Gazprombank, who left Russia during the outbreak of the 2022 Russian invasion of Ukraine and joined the Freedom of Russia Legion, said in an interview with The Insider that he thought that his former colleague Vladislav Avayev's alleged murder of his family and subsequent suicide had been staged: "Why? That is difficult to say. Perhaps he knew something and posed some kind of danger." Likewise, Sergey Protosenya's son, who was not in Spain when his parents and sister were found dead in Lloret de Mar, stated his father was not the perpetrator ("my father is not a murderer"), but that his parents and sister were murdered by someone else. Protosenya was the former CEO of gas giant Novatek, which published a statement saying he was "a real family man", and called on the Spanish authorities to conduct a thorough and impartial investigation. Businessman and critic of the Russian federal government Bill Browder has opined that Putin is personally ordering executions of influential business leaders in critical sectors whom he feels will not be yes-men and intimidates their successors with threats of death or violence.

Various other commentators also ruled out suicides or poor health. Other commentators, including Fiona Hill and Mark Galeotti, are skeptical of such conspiracies. They point out the deaths are not necessarily all connected, and that it is far more likely some really are suicides, and some could be killings by competing influential clans to wipe out competitors without a centralized Kremlin effort.
The suicide rate in Russia is the third-highest in the world, and similar trends have been noted in 2020 about doctors who have treated COVID-19 patients falling from high windows. Suicides could be further increased especially in the Russian business community due to substantial pressure from the war in Ukraine and international sanctions.

According to an investigative report by Novaya Gazeta, some of the deaths may be connected to large scale accounting fraud by Gazprom executives, who may have funneled money to a network of businesses owned by friends and family members with ties to the FSB and Russian military.

List of deaths

See also
 2022–2023 Russian military commissariats attacks
 2022–2023 Russian mystery fires
 List of journalists killed in Russia
 List of Russian generals killed during the 2022 invasion of Ukraine
 List of Soviet and Russian assassinations
 Political prisoners in Russia
 Russian apartment bombings

Assassinations and assassination attempts
 Assassination attempts on Volodymyr Zelenskyy
 Assassination of Anna Politkovskaya (7 October 2006)
 Poisoning of Alexander Litvinenko (1 November 2006)
 Murder of Yuriy Chervochkin (22 November 2007)
 Assassination of Boris Nemtsov (27 February 2015)
 Pavel Sheremet's car explosion (20 July 2016)
 Shooting of Denis Voronenkov (23 March 2017)
 Assassination of Maksym Shapoval (27 June 2017)
 Poisoning of Sergei and Yulia Skripal (4 March 2018)
 Poisoning of Pyotr Verzilov (12 September 2018)
 Poisoning of Alexei Navalny (20 August 2020)

References

External links
 "Every Russian Official Who Has Died Since Putin Invaded Ukraine—Full List" by Giulia Carbonaro, in Newsweek (2022-04-22)
 

2022 in Russia
2023 in Russia
Lists of deaths in 2022
Lists of deaths in 2023
Unsolved murders in Russia
Impacts of the 2022 Russian invasion of Ukraine